Richard Bastiaan Verschoor (born 16 December 2000) is a Dutch racing driver currently competing for Van Amersfoort Racing in the Formula 2 Championship. Verschoor graduated to Formula 2 in 2021 with MP Motorsport before switching to Charouz Racing System, after two years in the FIA Formula 3 Championship with MP Motorsport.

Verschoor became the first Dutch driver to win the Macau Grand Prix, winning at his first attempt in 2019. He is a former Red Bull Junior Team member, the 2016 SMP F4 and Spanish F4 champion, where he won both single-seater championships in his debut year.

Career

Karting 
Verschoor started karting in 2011. He raced in several national karting series in the Netherlands from 2011 to 2013. In 2014, Verschoor moved to the European series where he won the CIK-FIA Karting Academy Trophy. He remained victorious in 2015, when he won German Karting Championship. Also in 2015, he finished sixth and third in the World and European CIK-FIA KF Championship respectively.

Formula 4 
Verschoor moved to single-seaters in 2016, joining the SMP F4 Championship at 15 years old. He won the opening race of the season at Sochi, taking his first single-seater victory. Following this, he had a series of ten consecutive wins and took the championship title with three races to spare, nearly 70 points ahead of fellow Dutch racer Jarno Opmeer.

Verschoor also contested the other Koiranen GP's series, the maiden F4 Spanish Championship with MP Motorsport. He won the first race of the campaign, and proceeded to claim his second title in dominant form, winning all but three races. He also had part-time campaigns in ADAC Formula 4 with Motopark and Italian F4 with Bhaitech Engineering.

Toyota Racing Series

2017 
In 2017, before Verschoor's main campaign, he participated in the Toyota Racing Series with Giles Motorsport. He took two podiums in the opening round to take the championship lead early on. He picked up his first win in the series at Teretonga after Thomas Randle picked up a post-race penalty. A further win in the third race stretched his lead even more. However, he would get one more win and another podium for the rest of the season. He eventually lost out on the championship and ultimately ended third in the standings.

2018 
Verschoor returned to the Toyota Racing Series in 2018, with M2 Competition. He won the opening races in the first three rounds, putting him in a championship fight. Despite winning two races in the final round, he placed as runner-up in the championship, losing out by five points to champion Robert Shwartzman.

Formula Renault Eurocup

2017 

In January 2017, it was announced Verschoor would continue his relationship with MP Motorsport and step up to Formula Renault Eurocup alongside new Red Bull Junior Neil Verhagen. He scored points in the first two rounds. He had one podium in the penultimate race of the season at Circuit de Barcelona-Catalunya and finished the season ninth. However, he had a streak of seven consecutive non-scoring finishes from Hungary to Austria. He then secured a fourth place in Paul Ricard, before earning his maiden podium in the series with a third, at the final round in Barcelona. Overall, he ended ninth overall in the standings, and fourth in the rookies'.

Verschoor also took part in a part-time campaign in the Northern European Cup that year. He made his debut in Assen, where he took a second place and a victory. He achieved another podium in Hockenheim to rank ninth overall.

2018 

In December 2017, it was announced that he would switch to Josef Kaufmann Racing, the team which won the last two Eurocup driver titles with Lando Norris and Sacha Fenestraz. However, in his first year without Red Bull, his season was not to be promising. His highlight of the season was mainly a second place in a red-flagged race at the Red Bull Ring. Three more points finishes followed, before he was dropped by the team. He was not replaced. Verschoor ended his season 13th overall, with one podium.

Verschoor competed as a guest driver in the Northern European Cup,in one round at Spa-Francorchamps.  He finished the races in eighth and tenth.

GP3 Series 
On 22 August 2018, Roberto Merhi left the 2018 FIA Formula 2 Championship. Dorian Boccolacci was promoted to replace him at MP Motorsport, leaving a vacancy in the GP3 seat. Verschoor entered the GP3 Series at the round 6 in Spa-Francorchamps. He scored his first points in just his second race with seventh, having been excluded from qualifying. He scored four more points finishes over the next three rounds, including a third place podium in Sochi. Overall, finished 15th in the standings, with 30 points.

FIA Formula 3 Championship

2019 

In 2019 Verschoor was announced to continue his relationship with MP Motorsport in the newly formed FIA Formula 3 Championship. 

In the first round in Barcelona, Verschoor qualified 15th. He did not score any points and lacked pace to finish 19th in both races. In France, Verschoor qualified 13th and finished a place down in the first race. However in the second race, Verschoor had great pace overtaking car after car to finish fourth. At the Red Bull Ring, Verschoor qualified 12th and finished tenth, scoring a point after overtaking Niko Kari in the final two laps of the first race. In the second race, he dropped to twelfth, despite being in sixth position at the start of the race. Verschoor would go on and not score any points for the next three rounds. Starting 18th in Silverstone, Verschoor finished 17th and 21st in the races. In Hungary, Verschoor started 16th and cruised his way up to 13th in the first race. But on the final lap, Verschoor was forced to retire with an issue. He made a decent comeback to finish 17th in Race 2. He finished 17th and 11th in Spa-Francorchamps. The next two rounds were much more successful for Verschoor. He qualified eighth in Monza but started third due to penalties. He took the lead in a multi-car battle on lap 4, but Marcus Armstrong passed him just moments later. He would lose more places to Robert Shwartzman, Jehan Daruvala and Yuki Tsunoda to finish fifth, but was promoted to fourth following Armstrong's penalty. Verschoor followed it up with fourth in Race 2, one place behind teammate Lawson. In the final race in Sochi, Verschoor started 13th and worked his way up to tenth, scoring a point in the first race. In Race 2, he improved to seventh. Overall, Verschoor finished 13th in the championship with six points scoring finishes, racking up a total of 34 points.

Verschoor was announced to compete  in the Macau Grand Prix for MP Motorsport. He finished fifth and four in qualifying and the qualification race. He overtook Robert Shwartzman and Christian Lundgaard for second and sat behind Jüri Vips. On lap 8 out of 15, Verschoor passed Vips and despite defending from him late in the race, Verschoor pressed on to win the Macau Grand Prix. In doing so, Verschoor become the first Dutch driver to win the Macau Grand Prix and the first rookie to win the event since Keisuke Kunimoto in the 2008 edition. After the race, Verschoor revealed that he raced with bent steering after he clouted the wall whilst taking the lead.

2020 
Verschoor remained in the 2020 FIA Formula 3 Championship, still with MP Motorsport and was partnered alongside Bent Viscaal and Lukas Dunner. 

Verschoor qualified ninth in the first race weekend at the Red Bull Ring and finished eighth in the first race, Lining up third for the second race, he lost a position at the start to former teammate Liam Lawson. Later during the race, Verschoor overtook David Beckmann and Clément Novalak to claim second and his maiden podium in the series. Verschoor qualified 11th for the second Red Bull Ring round. In treacherous conditions during the first race, he worked his way up to seventh before the race was stopped. In the second race, Verschoor dropped two positions to sixth at the start, but finished in fourth as Lawson and Jake Hughes collided during the final few laps. Verschoor started Race 1 in Hungary eighth. He cleared the chaos at the start, and managed to finish fifth in the end before being promoted to fourth due to a penalty from Logan Sargeant. He achieved fifth place in the second race, this time inheriting a penalty from teammate Viscaal.

Verschoor qualified 15th for Silverstone. He finished just outside the points, in eleventh for the first race, and scored points in the second race in ninth. For the second Silverstone round, Verschoor qualified all the way down in 27th. His low position meant he only finished 19th and 18th in the races. In Barcelona, Verschoor started tenth for Race 1. He had an uneventful race, making up a position to finish ninth. Lining up second for Race 2, Verschoor lost positions to Alex Peroni and Oscar Piastri to slip to fourth. He would remain there for the whole of the race.

For the Spa-Francorchamps round, Verschoor qualified a season best sixth. However, he dropped to tenth in the first race, giving him reverse pole. He stayed in the lead until lap 3, where Sargeant passed him on the Kemmel Straight. He would fall down the order and finish seventh. Verschoor qualified 17th in Monza but started 14th due to penalties. However, due to an issue he finished 27th. In a chaotic race, Verschoor charged from the back to finish tenth. For the Mugello season finale, Verschoor started 14th and finished Race 1 in 12th place, before following it up with fifth in the second race. Overall, Verschoor scored 69 points throughout the season to rank ninth in the standings. He also achieved a total of thirteen top 10 finishes and was the highest of all MP drivers.

FIA Formula 2 Championship

2021 

Verschoor took part in Formula 2 pre-season testing with MP Motorsport. He was soon to continue his relationship with them for the 2021 Formula 2 Championship, partnering F3 graduate Lirim Zendeli. However he was only on a deal for the Bahrain round. He qualified an impressive sixth, before being promoted to fifth when Jüri Vips was disqualified. His debut in sprint race 1 was not to be, as on the second lap he was tipped into a spin by Dan Ticktum, sending Verschoor out of the race. He made a brilliant recovery in sprint race 2, making up eight positions in the last six laps to finish fifth. Starting on the hard tyres for the feature race, Verschoor made up a place at the start, but eventually fell to tenth. He pitted under the safety car for softs, and sat in third place. He then passed Marcus Armstrong and then a lap later, on Oscar Piastri to take the lead of the race on lap 20. Verschoor's lead lasted eight laps before he was overtaken by Guanyu Zhou. He began struggling with his tyres and lost positions to Ticktum and Liam Lawson, and eventually finished fourth. Verschoor was retained for the Monaco round. He qualified 15th overall, and finished the first sprint race in 13th, thanks to two retirements. For the second sprint, he moved up to seventh. In the feature race, he took a solitary point with tenth.

Verschoor retained his seat for the third round in Baku and qualified 16th. He had a weekend to forget, finishing the first sprint in 13th and retiring in the second sprint after Roy Nissany hit the back of him, sending Verschoor into the wall. During the feature race, Verschoor hit the back of fellow Dutchman Bent Viscaal, with both losing a lot of time. Verschoor eventually finished 14th. In Silverstone, Verschoor qualified an impressive third, only behind the two Alpine juniors of Piastri and Zhou. He finished tenth in the first sprint, and got reverse pole for the second sprint. 
Verschoor went on to pick up his first F2 win, ahead of Marcus Armstrong. Verschoor eventually hailed his getaway as "by far the fastest". In the feature race, he lost out to Ticktum at the start. Late in the race, he would pressure Piastri for third place but ultimately had to settle for fourth.

Verschoor qualified 20th in Monza. In a chaotic first sprint race, he rose as high as tenth at one point but retired due to technical issues. Verschoor put up some clean overtakes in the second sprint to finish 14th. In the feature race, Verschoor lay in last after the pit stops due to double stacking. He made a charge to finish seventh, however all effort would be undone as he was disqualified, due to his car weight being below requirement.
In Sochi, Verschoor qualified 15th and finished the only sprint race in eighth, as Jehan Daruvala spun late on. Verschoor again finished eighth in the feature race.

Unfortunately for Verschoor, due to budgetary issues, he was replaced for the last two rounds of the season by 2021 Formula 3 vice-champion Jack Doohan. However, Verschoor was called in to replace Enzo Fittipaldi at Charouz Racing System for the final round in Abu Dhabi, as the Brazilian was injured following a crash in the Jeddah round. He scored a point in the feature race with tenth. Verschoor finished the season in 11th place, with 56 points.

2022 

At the end of February, Verschoor was confirmed to join Trident Racing for the 2022 Formula 2 season to be racing alongside Australian Calan Williams. This marked the end of his relationship with MP Motorsport after six years. He qualified ninth for the first round of the season in Bahrain, and lined up second for the sprint race. Verschoor started his season in perfect fashion, taking the lead from Felipe Drugovich and winning the first sprint race of the year, taking Trident's first win in the series in the process. During the feature race, Verschoor was scrapping away in the midfield, and he was hit by Enzo Fittipaldi on lap 27, which saw the end of Verschoor's race. Afterwards, unrelated to that incident, Verschoor slammed DAMS driver Roy Nissany for his dangerous driving, stating that [Nissany] "doesn't deserve a racing license." Verschoor continued his success in the second round in Jeddah, qualifying second in a red flag filled qualifying session. In the sprint race, he finished in fifth, directly behind his teammate Williams. He got his first feature race podium after finishing second behind pole sitter Drugovich in the feature race. His excellent start saw him jump to third in the standings, only behind Drugovich and Liam Lawson.

This would prove to be a false dawn, as Verschoor and Trident would fail to score a single point for the next three rounds. He qualified a lowly 19th in Imola, and he finished the races in 13th and 14th. In Barcelona, Verschoor qualified 20th, and improved nine places in the sprint race to eleventh. In the feature race, a technical issue in his car hampered his pace and only could manage 18th. His weekend in Monaco was not too much better, as Verschoor did not participate in qualifying due to car issues but was allowed to race. He made great overtakes in the tight circuit to place 13th and 12th in the sprint and feature races respectively. In Baku Verschoor was back on form to qualify in sixth. While battling for third with Lawson on the third last lap of the sprint race, Verschoor outbraked himself, sending him into the barries and damaging his front suspension. In a chaotic feature race, Verschoor steered clear to finish fifth.

In Silverstone, Verschoor finished tenth in the sprint and 14th in the feature race, having started 15th. For the Red Bull Ring round, Verschoor qualified eighth. Starting third in the sprint race, he lost positions at the start, and eventually finished sixth. In the feature race, Verschoor started on slicks, with everyone in front of him on wets. As the track dried up, Verschoor would make the right gamble and on lap 7, passed Jüri Vips, who was on wets. He would win the race by several seconds, and just moments after taking the chequered flag, he ran out of fuel and stopped on track. Tragically, Verschoor was disqualified for having too little fuel in his car, thus promoting Logan Sargeant to victory. 

In the Paul Ricard round, Verschoor qualified 11th. He stalled during the start of the sprint race, and his car developed a technical issue. By the time he got going, he was five laps down. During the feature race, Verschoor battled his way to ninth before a powertrain issue saw him retire on the final lap, throwing away points in the process. In Hungary, Verschoor started 14th and in the sprint race, finish 16th. In the feature race, Verschoor started on the harder rubber and at the end of the race, made skilful overtakes to take points and finish eighth.

In Spa-Francorchamps, Verschoor qualified in seventh place. He defended from Théo Pourchaire but ultimately the Frenchman was unable to pass him. On the final lap, Verschoor was passed by Drugovich but nevertheless wrapped up the race in fifth place. In the feature race, Verschoor chose the alternate strategy and nearing the end of the race, overtook multiple runners. He finished fourth, capping off a successful weekend. At Zandvoort, a circuit where he had not driven since 2016, He secured fourth place in qualifying and in the sprint race finished seventh. In the feature race, he made an overcut pit stop on Dennis Hauger, who jumped him at the start. During a safety car restart, Verschoor punted Jack Doohan out of the race. Verschoor then scaled through for second place and a home podium. Despite not being penalised for the clash with Doohan, Verschoor apologised to him after the race.

In Monza, Verschoor qualified fifth and finished in the same position in the sprint race, but was demoted to eighth place for gaining an advantage off-track. In the feature race, he ran on the alternate strategy but a safety car and red flag mid-race ruined his chances of a good result. Despite that, a pass late in the race on Marino Sato sealed tenth place, before being promoted to ninth following Ayumu Iwasa's disqualification. In Abu Dhabi, Verschoor qualified tenth. From reverse pole in the sprint race, he remained in the lead until lap 10, where he was passed by Lawson. Still, he collected a second place and added another podium. In the feature race, starting on the harder tyres would prove well, as he used his fresher tyres in the end to finish seventh. Verschoor ended the year 12th in the standings with 103 points, claiming one win and three more podiums.

2023 
Verschoor participated in the post-season test with Van Amersfoort Racing. On his 22nd birthday, the Dutch outfit confirmed that they had signed Verschoor for the 2023 season alongside Juan Manuel Correa. Verschoor again started his season in Bahrain positively, qualifying third. He failed to score points in the sprint race and chances of them were dashed after a lap 1 feature race spin caused by Frederik Vesti. What followed was a storming drive, making up numerous positions in the end with fresher tyres for fifth place.

Formula One 
In 2016, following his maiden single-seater victory, Verschoor was one of four to be added into the Red Bull Junior Team that year. However, in December 2017, it was announced that Verschoor would cease to be part of Red Bull, the Dutchman stating that "[Red Bull] mainly just added pressure".

Karting record

Karting career summary

Complete CIK-FIA Academy Trophy results

Racing record

Racing career summary 

† As Verschoor was a guest driver, he was ineligible for points.
* Season still in progress.

Complete SMP F4 Championship results 
(key) (Races in bold indicate pole position) (Races in italics indicate fastest lap)

Complete F4 Spanish Championship results 
(key) (Races in bold indicate pole position) (Races in italics indicate fastest lap)

Complete V de V Challenge Monoplace results 
(key) (Races in bold indicate pole position) (Races in italics indicate fastest lap)

† As Verschoor was a guest driver, he was ineligible to score points.

Complete ADAC Formula 4 Championship results 
(key) (Races in bold indicate pole position) (Races in italics indicate fastest lap)

Complete Italian F4 Championship results 
(key) (Races in bold indicate pole position) (Races in italics indicate fastest lap)

Complete Toyota Racing Series results 
(key) (Races in bold indicate pole position) (Races in italics indicate fastest lap)

Complete Formula Renault Northern European Cup results 
(key) (Races in bold indicate pole position) (Races in italics indicate fastest lap)

† As Verschoor was a guest driver, he was ineligible to score points.

Complete Formula Renault Eurocup results 
(key) (Races in bold indicate pole position) (Races in italics indicate fastest lap)

Complete GP3 Series results 
(key) (Races in bold indicate pole position) (Races in italics indicate fastest lap)

Complete FIA Formula 3 Championship results 
(key) (Races in italics indicate fastest lap)

† Driver did not finish the race, but was classified as he completed over 90% of the race distance.
‡ Half points were awarded, as less than 75% of the scheduled distance was completed.

Complete Macau Grand Prix results

Complete FIA Formula 2 Championship results 
(key) (Races in bold indicate pole position) (Races in italics indicate fastest lap)

References

External links
 
 
 Richard Verschoor profile on Red Bull Junior Team site

2000 births
Living people
Sportspeople from Utrecht (province)
Dutch racing drivers
Karting World Championship drivers
Spanish F4 Championship drivers
ADAC Formula 4 drivers
Italian F4 Championship drivers
Toyota Racing Series drivers
Formula Renault Eurocup drivers
SMP F4 Championship drivers
Formula Renault 2.0 NEC drivers
Dutch GP3 Series drivers
FIA Formula 3 Championship drivers
FIA Formula 2 Championship drivers
MP Motorsport drivers
Motopark Academy drivers
M2 Competition drivers
Josef Kaufmann Racing drivers
Trident Racing drivers
Charouz Racing System drivers
Bhaitech drivers
Van Amersfoort Racing drivers